The eighth season of the American horror anthology television series American Horror Story, subtitled Apocalypse, features the witches from the New Orleans coven as they battle the Antichrist and attempt to prevent the world from ending. The season is presented as a crossover between Murder House, Coven, and Hotel. The ensemble cast includes Sarah Paulson, Evan Peters, Adina Porter, Billie Lourd, Leslie Grossman, Cody Fern, Emma Roberts, Cheyenne Jackson, and Kathy Bates, with all returning from previous seasons, except newcomer Fern.

Created by Ryan Murphy and Brad Falchuk for cable network FX, the series is produced by 20th Century Fox Television. Apocalypse was broadcast between September 12 and November 14, 2018, consisting of 10 episodes. The season was announced in January 2017 and received positive reviews from critics, with many considering it an improvement over previous installments. In April 2019, the Television Academy announced that, for the first time in the series' history, a season would not qualify for the Limited Series categories, and would instead be moved to Drama. Apocalypse would go on to receive five Emmy Awards nominations, including Outstanding Guest Actress in a Drama Series for Jessica Lange.

Cast and characters

Main

 Sarah Paulson as Wilhemina Venable, Cordelia Goode, and Billie Dean Howard
 Evan Peters as Mr. Gallant, James Patrick March, Tate Langdon, and Jeff Pfister
 Adina Porter as Dinah Stevens
 Billie Lourd as Mallory
 Leslie Grossman as Coco St. Pierre Vanderbilt
 Cody Fern as Michael Langdon
 Emma Roberts as Madison Montgomery
 Cheyenne Jackson as John Henry Moore
 Kathy Bates as Miriam Mead, Miriam Mead 2.0, and Delphine LaLaurie

Recurring
 Billy Eichner as Brock and Mutt Nutter
 Kyle Allen as Timothy Campbell 
 Ash Santos as Emily Campbell
 Jeffrey Bowyer-Chapman as Andre Stevens
 Joan Collins as Evie Gallant and Bubbles McGee
 Frances Conroy as Myrtle Snow and Moira O'Hara
 Taissa Farmiga as Zoe Benson and Violet Harmon
 Gabourey Sidibe as Queenie 
 Billy Porter as Behold Chablis
 Carlo Rota as Anton LaVey
 Jamie Brewer as Nan
 Erika Ervin as The Fist
 Naomi Grossman as Samantha Crowe
 Jon Jon Briones as Ariel Augustus
BD Wong as Baldwin Pennypacker

Guest stars
 Dina Meyer as Nora Campbell 
 Travis Schuldt as Mr. Campbell 
 John Getz as Mr. St. Pierre Vanderbilt 
 Chad James Buchanan as Stu 
 Sean Blakemore as a cooperative agent
 Lesley Fera as a cooperative agent
 Lily Rabe as Misty Day
 Stevie Nicks as Herself 
 Wayne Pére as Mr. Kingery
 Dylan McDermott as Dr. Ben Harmon 
 Connie Britton as Vivien Harmon 
 Jessica Lange as Constance Langdon
 Mena Suvari as Elizabeth Short 
 Sam Kinsey as Beau Langdon 
 Celia Finkelstein as Gladys 
 Lance Reddick as Papa Legba 
 Sandra Bernhard as Hannah 
 Harriet Sansom Harris as Madelyn 
 Dominic Burgess as Phil 
 Mark Ivanir as Nicholas II of Russia 
 Emilia Ares as Anastasia Nikolaevna of Russia 
 Yevgeniy Kartashov as Yakov Yurovsky
 Angela Bassett as Marie Laveau

Episodes

Production

Development
On January 12, 2017, the series was renewed for an eighth season, which premiered on September 12, 2018. In October 2016, series co-creator Ryan Murphy announced a "crossover" season between previous cycles Murder House and Coven. In January 2018, he stated that the ninth season would most likely feature the crossover; however, in June 2018, he announced that the eighth season was chosen instead. Murphy has also stated that the eighth season would be set 18 months in the future and would feature an Asylum and Coven tone. In July 2018, it was announced at the San Diego Comic-Con that the title of the season would be Apocalypse.

In April 2018, it was revealed that series veteran Sarah Paulson and Evan Peters would make their directorial debut in an episode. It was later revealed that Paulson would direct the sixth episode. Peters, in the end, did not direct an episode.

As with previous seasons, several teasers were released. On September 4, 2018, a short trailer was released, followed by a longer trailer the next day.

Casting
In October 2017, it was announced that series mainstay Sarah Paulson would return for the season. In March 2018, it was announced that Kathy Bates and Evan Peters would also return, leading the season with Paulson. In April 2018, Joan Collins joined the cast as the grandmother of Peters' character. In April and May 2018, Cult actors Adina Porter, Cheyenne Jackson, Billy Eichner, Leslie Grossman, and Billie Lourd were also confirmed to return. 

In June 2018, Emma Roberts revealed that she would return for Apocalypse, reprising her role as Madison Montgomery from Coven. That same month, Murphy revealed that other witches from Coven had all been invited to return, and also stated that he had asked Anjelica Huston to join the cast, while Paulson confirmed that she would reprise her Coven role, Cordelia Goode. In July 2018, it was reported that Jeffrey Bowyer-Chapman and Kyle Allen would guest star in the season. Later that month, Murphy revealed via Twitter that American Crime Story actor Cody Fern joined the cast as a grown-up Michael Langdon, the Antichrist born during the events of Murder House.

In August 2018, Pose actor Billy Porter announced via Instagram that he would appear in the season. Later, during the Television Critics Association press tour, it was announced that Jessica Lange would appear in the season's sixth episode as her Murder House character, Constance Langdon. After FX released the season's first teaser, actress Lesley Fera revealed via Twitter that she would appear in the season premiere. Later, Ryan Murphy confirmed via Twitter that Taissa Farmiga, Gabourey Sidibe, Lily Rabe, Frances Conroy, and Stevie Nicks would all appear during the season, and that they would all reprise the roles they played in Coven. In the same month, Angela Bassett, who appeared in four previous seasons, confirmed that she would not appear in the season; however, Bassett appeared in the last episode of the season, playing Marie Laveau, the role she played in Coven. Later, Finn Wittrock, who appeared in three past seasons, confirmed that he would not appear in Apocalypse. The same day, it was announced that original cast members Connie Britton and Dylan McDermott would be returning for the season, and Ryan Murphy later confirmed that they would reprise their Murder House roles, Vivien and Ben Harmon, respectively. Later, Murphy revealed that Evan Peters and Taissa Farmiga would be reprising their Murder House roles, Tate Langdon and Violet Harmon, respectively. 

In September 2018, it was revealed that Erika Ervin would be returning for Apocalypse after having a recurring role in Freak Show. It was also reported that actress Ash Santos would appear in the season.

Filming
In April 2018, Murphy revealed that filming for the season would begin in June 2018.

Reception

Critical response
American Horror Story: Apocalypse received positive reviews, with many considering it as an improvement over the recent seasons. The review aggregator Rotten Tomatoes gave the season a 79% approval rating, with an average rating of 6.95/10, based on 8 reviews. The critical consensus reads, "Ryan Murphy and his murderers' row of witchy performers literally save the world -- and franchise -- in Apocalypse, the series' most ambitious crossover swing yet." On Metacritic, the season was given a score of 63 out of 100 based on 6 reviews, indicating "generally favorable reviews".

Awards and nominations

In its eighth season, the series has been nominated for 20 awards. Five of them were won.

Ratings

Home media

References

External links
 
 
 
 

2018 American television seasons
2010s American drama television series
2010s American time travel television series
08
American time travel television series
Androids in television
Cannibalism in fiction
Dark fantasy television series
Demons in television
Fiction about the Devil
Fiction about Louisiana Voodoo
Fiction about nuclear war and weapons
Fictional depictions of the Antichrist
Genocide in fiction
Ghosts in television
Fiction about human sacrifice
Mass murder in fiction
Post-apocalyptic fiction
Satanism in popular culture
Television about magic
Television series about witchcraft
Television series set in the future
Wizards in television